The St. Johns Signal Tower Gas Station, located in the St. Johns neighborhood of north Portland, Oregon, is listed on the National Register of Historic Places.  It was built and opened in 1939 as a gas station for the Signal Oil Company.  It was in operation as a gas station until 1984, but changed brand from Signal Gas to Hellman's Golden Eagle Gas Station in 1954 and, in turn, became a Chevron station in 1965.  In 1984, it was converted into a florist shop, the gasoline tanks being decommissioned at that time and filled with concrete, and it functioned in that capacity until 2002. The structure was added to the National Register in 2003.

In 2006, the building was converted into a restaurant, Signal Station Pizza, and it was still in use by the same business in 2015.

See also
 National Register of Historic Places listings in North Portland, Oregon

References

1939 establishments in Oregon
Buildings and structures in St. Johns, Portland, Oregon
Commercial buildings completed in 1939
Gas stations on the National Register of Historic Places in Oregon
Moderne architecture in Oregon
National Register of Historic Places in Portland, Oregon
Pizzerias in Portland, Oregon
Transportation buildings and structures in Portland, Oregon
Transportation buildings and structures on the National Register of Historic Places in Oregon